Kolah Deraz may refer to:
 Kolah Deraz-e Olya
 Kolah Deraz-e Sofla
 Kolah Deraz-e Vosta